Tongjiang County is a county in the northeast of Sichuan Province, China, bordering Shaanxi Province to the north.

Geography 
Tongjiang is located south of the eastern section of the Micang Mountain ranges. The area has features geographical features known as Karst topography.
Tongjiang has resources of natural gas, marble, dolomite, gypsum and  uranium.

Transportation 

Provincial Highways 201 and 302 are main roads through Tongjiang County.

Economy

History and Tourism 

The Sichuan-Shaanxi border area of Tongjiang was the headquarters location for the formation of the Fourth Red Army, which became part of the People's Liberation Army. A cliff with a carved slogan "", which translates roughly to "Communization All of Sichuan" or "Redden All of Sichuan", is a well-known landmark in the area.

Tongjiang is also known for its local specialty of cooked Fungus, and is known colloquially as the “” or "Hometown of Chinese White Fungus", and is listed for national protection as the originating region of this product; much like Champagne is in France.

Climate

References

External links 
 Bazhong Tongjiang county government website

 
County-level divisions of Sichuan
Bazhong